An EMD SD28 is a 6-axle diesel locomotive built by General Motors Electro-Motive Division between July 1965 and September 1965.  Power was provided by an EMD 567D1 16-cylinder engine which generated . This locomotive was basically a non-turbocharged version of the EMD SD35. 6 examples of this locomotive model were built for American railroads. 

A passenger variant, type SDP28, was built for export to Korea in May 1966, with 6 delivered. Only 1 SD28 is left it is owned by Cargill and operates in Iowa.

Original Buyers

References 

 
 Thompson, J. David. EMD SD28, SD35 and related models Original Owners. Retrieved on August 27, 2006

SD28
C-C locomotives
Diesel-electric locomotives of the United States
Diesel-electric locomotives of South Korea
Railway locomotives introduced in 1965
Standard gauge locomotives of the United States
Standard gauge locomotives of South Korea